This is a list of Dallas Stars award winners. It also includes players and data from the previous incarnation of the franchise, the Minnesota North Stars.

League awards

Team trophies

Individual awards

All-Stars

NHL first and second team All-Stars
The NHL first and second team All-Stars are the top players at each position as voted on by the Professional Hockey Writers' Association.

NHL All-Rookie Team
The NHL All-Rookie Team consists of the top rookies at each position as voted on by the Professional Hockey Writers' Association.

All-Star Game selections
The National Hockey League All-Star Game is a mid-season exhibition game held annually between many of the top players of each season. Forty-four All-Star Games have been held since the Dallas Stars entered the NHL as the Minnesota North Stars in 1967, with at least one player chosen to represent the franchise in each year. The All-Star game has not been held in various years: 1979 and 1987 due to the 1979 Challenge Cup and Rendez-vous '87 series between the NHL and the Soviet national team, respectively, 1995, 2005, and 2013 as a result of labor stoppages, 2006, 2010, and 2014 because of the Winter Olympic Games, and 2021 as a result of the COVID-19 pandemic. The franchise has hosted two of the games. The 25th took place at the Met Center, then known as the Metropolitan Sports Center, and the 55th took place at the American Airlines Center.

 Selected by fan vote
 Selected by Commissioner

Career achievements

Hockey Hall of Fame
The following is a list of Dallas Stars who have been enshrined in the Hockey Hall of Fame.

Foster Hewitt Memorial Award
Two members of the Dallas Stars organization have been honored with the Foster Hewitt Memorial Award. The award is presented by the Hockey Hall of Fame to members of the radio and television industry who make outstanding contributions to their profession and the game of ice hockey during their broadcasting career.

Lester Patrick Trophy
The Lester Patrick Trophy has been presented by the National Hockey League and USA Hockey since 1966 to honor a recipient's contribution to ice hockey in the United States. This list includes all personnel who have ever been employed by the Dallas Stars franchise in any capacity and have also received the Lester Patrick Trophy.

United States Hockey Hall of Fame

Retired numbers

The Dallas Stars have retired six of their jersey numbers. Two of them – Bill Goldsworthy's number 8 and Bill Masterton's number 19 – were retired while the team was still in Minnesota. Also out of circulation is the number 99 which was retired league-wide for Wayne Gretzky on February 6, 2000. Gretzky did not play for the Stars during his 20-year NHL career and no Stars player had ever worn the number 99 prior to its retirement.

Team awards

Mike Modano Trophy
The Mike Modano Trophy is an annual award given to the player who leads the team in scoring at the end of the regular season. It was introduced in 2014 and is named for Stars great Mike Modano.

Normandy Homes Star of the game Award
The Normandy Homes Star of the game Award is an annual award given to the player who earns the most points from Star of the game selections throughout the regular season.

See also
List of National Hockey League awards

References

Dallas Stars
award